Students of Sustainability (SoS) is an annual conference of the Australian student environment and social justice movement and predates the Australian Student Environment Network (ASEN). The first Students of Sustainability conference was held at ANU in 1991 when it was called Students, Science and Sustainability. The name changed in 1995 to Students and Sustainability and then again in 2003 to Students of Sustainability. In each case the name changes were to make the conference open to a wider range of participants.   Students of Sustainability always runs in July co-currently with NAIDOC week, Aboriginal and Islander politics and affairs play a major part in the SOS program.

History
The conference began in Canberra in 1991 under the name 'Students, Science and Sustainability'. This first conference (April 24–26, 1991) attracted more than 300 students from every Australian State and Territory to discuss matters of sustainability with respect to students and science. This first conference was organised by a small group of ANU undergraduates, including John Reynolds, Padma Raman, Tristan Armstrong, Naomi Flutter and Joely-Kym Sobott, among others. One of the many high profile speakers was the late Australian historian Manning Clark AC. 
Since then, interest and enthusiasm for the conference has grown, and the number of participants has steadily increased. As SoS moves around the country, it spreads its unique, life-affirming, change-making energy to the University and community that hosts it.

Description
From the website www.studentsofsustainability.org which is run by the hosting crew each year:

Aims of SoS
•  to inspire ecologically sustainable practices as an alternative - to current societal values 
•  to empower individuals and groups to bring about positive social and political change through open forums, skill sharing opportunities 
•  to create national and international networks of environmentally-minded people 
•  to integrate environmentalism with other progressive movements such as human rights and cultural awareness movements 
•  and to create a conference that is accessible to as many people as possible.

Organise - The SoS organising committee advocates supportive, respectful and constructive involvement in all aspects of the conference. All participants share their knowledge and learn from each other, bringing their own opinions, voices and ideas. This diversity of voices, ideas and opinions makes SoS what it is.

Locations
The location of SoS varies each year depending on the location of the bidding organising collective. Past and present SoS locations include:

2020 (January) - University of Sydney Cumberland Campus, Sydney
2018 -  Melbourne Polytechnic Fairfield campus Melbourne
2017 - Tighes Hill TAFE, Newcastle
2016 - Musgrave Park, Brisbane
2015 - Flinders University, Adelaide
2014 - Australian National University, Canberra
2013 - University of Tasmania, Launceston
2012 - La Trobe University, Bendigo
2011 - Charles Sturt University, Albury
2010 - Flinders University, Adelaide
2009 - Monash University, Melbourne
2008 - Newcastle University, Newcastle
2007 - Murdoch University, Perth
2006 - University of Queensland, Brisbane
2005 - Monash University, Melbourne
2004 - La Trobe University, Melbourne
2003 - Flinders University, Adelaide
2002 - Murdoch University, Perth
2001 - University of Newcastle, Newcastle
2000 - Griffith University, Brisbane
1999 - University of Western Sydney, Sydney
1998 - University of Tasmania, Hobart
1997 - James Cook University, Townsville
1996 - Southern Cross University, Lismore
1995 - Flinders University, Adelaide
1994 - Macquarie University, Sydney
1993 - Melbourne University, Melbourne
1992 - Griffith University, Brisbane or Gold Coast
1991 - Australian National University, Canberra

External links

References

Environmental conferences